Simon Allen (born 5 September 1983) is a New Zealand cricketer. He played six List A matches for Wellington between 2007 and 2009. He was also part of New Zealand's squad for the 2002 Under-19 Cricket World Cup.

References

External links
 

1983 births
Living people
New Zealand cricketers
Wellington cricketers
Cricketers from Wellington City